The Portugal–Spain border, also referred to as "The Stripe", is one of the oldest borders in the world. The current demarcation is almost identical to that defined in 1297 by the Treaty of Alcañices.

A microstate existed previously on the border called Couto Misto.

Bordering districts and provinces

Districts on the Portuguese side of the border from North to South:
 Viana do Castelo District (Northern Portugal)
 Braga District (Northern Portugal)
 Vila Real District (Northern Portugal)
 Bragança District (Northern Portugal)
 Guarda District (Central Portugal)
 Castelo Branco District (Central Portugal)
 Portalegre District (Alentejo)
 Évora District (Alentejo)
 Beja District (Alentejo)
 Faro District (Algarve)

Provinces on the Spanish side of the border from North to South:
Province of Pontevedra ( Galicia)
Province of Ourense ( Galicia)
Province of Zamora ( Castile and León)
Province of Salamanca ( Castile and León)
Province of Cáceres ( Extremadura)
Province of Badajoz ( Extremadura)
Province of Huelva ( Andalusia)

Customs and identity checks
Portugal and Spain signed the Schengen Agreement in June 1991. This came into effect on 26 March 1995, making Portugal and Spain part of the Schengen area, and thus their boundary became an open border.

Portugal has since reintroduced border checks several times along the border with Spain: during the UEFA Euro 2004 championships, during the NATO 2010 Lisbon summit, and during Pope Francis's visit to Fátima in May 2017.

On 16 March 2020, Portugal and Spain reintroduced border checks due to the COVID-19 pandemic, with most people unable to cross; cross-border workers and goods were allowed to pass.
The checks were planned until 15 May 2020. They were initially extended until 15 June 2020 
and eventually until 1 July 2020.

On 29 January 2021, Portugal closed the border with Spain due to the COVID-19 pandemic; only people with exceptional reasons (force majeure) were able to cross. The planned closure was expected to last for fourteen days, but this was extended to 1 March. The closure was further lengthened to 16 March 2021, then again to 5 April 2021. It was extended again to 15 April 2021 and then to 3 May 2021. This was eventually shortened to 1 May 2021.

Border crossing checkpoints
Valença-Tui
Vila Verde da Raia-Verín
Quintanilha-San Vitero
Vilar Formoso-Fuentes de Oñoro
Termas de Monfortinho-Cilleros
Marvão-Valencia de Alcántara
Elvas-Badajoz
Vila Verde de Ficalho-Rosal de la Frontera
Vila Real de Santo António-Ayamonte

Maritime borders
Portugal's maritime borders, also known as the Exclusive economic zone of Portugal is currently disputed by Spain in the Savage Islands area, between Madeira and the Canary Islands.

Important treaties
 Treaty of Zamora (1143) - The victory of king Afonso I of Portugal over his cousin king Alfonso VII of León at the Battle of Valdevez, forced the Kingdom of León to recognise Portugal as a country, thus establishing the northern borders of Portugal. 
 Treaty of Badajoz (1267) - Signed by king Alfonso X of Castile and King Afonso III of Portugal, establishing the Guadiana as roughly the southern border.
 Treaty of Alcañices (1297) - Signed by King Denis of Portugal (grandson of king Alfonso X of Castile) and King Ferdinand IV of Castile, Olivença is ceded to Portugal.
 Treaty of Badajoz (1801) - Olivença is ceded to Spain.
 Congress of Vienna (1815) - Spain promises to return Olivença to Portugal, leaving this area of the border disputed ever since.
 Treaty of Lisbon (1864) - This abolished the Couto Misto microstate, partitioning it between Spain and Portugal.
 Convention of Limits (1926) - Demarcating the border from the confluence of Ribeira de Cuncos with the Guadiana, just south of Olivença, to the estuary of the Guadiana River, on the far South.

Border crossings

The busiest crossing point between Portugal and Spain is Tui-Valença, with the main international bridge concentrating half of the total international road traffic between both countries. Other important crossings are Vilar Formoso - Fuentes de Oñoro, Caminha and Bragança to Galicia, Portalegre and Elvas to Badajoz, and Castro Marim and Vila Real de Santo António to Ayamonte.

Bridges across the border include the Guadiana International Bridge and the Lower Guadiana International bridge.

An international bridge connects the Portuguese village of Várzea Grande (Arronches municipality) with the Spanish village of El Marco (La Codosera municipality). It is a wooden bridge only 3.2 meters long.

A zipline across the border exists between Sanlucar de Guadiana in Spain and Alcoutim in Portugal; it is the first and currently only zip line over an international border.

References

 
European Union internal borders
Borders of Portugal
Borders of Spain
International borders